Oceanwide Plaza is a partially-completed residential and retail complex composed of three towers in downtown Los Angeles, California, across the street from Crypto.com Arena and the Los Angeles Convention Center. Oceanwide Holdings is the owner and developer. The CallisonRTKL-designed complex will feature a five-star Park Hyatt hotel with interiors by Studio Munge, as well as 504 residences and a collection of retailers and restaurants. It will be home to the city's tallest residential tower, which commenced construction in 2015.

The towers currently have no completion date. It is unknown when the complex will open as the development process is beset by corruption charges and financing problems related to ongoing geopolitical tensions between the US and China. The scheduled opening date for 2020 has been postponed to an unknown date.

Design
Oceanwide Plaza was designed by CallisonRTKL. Tower one will feature a 184-room five star Park Hyatt hotel along with 164 Park Hyatt serviced condo residences; a live in hotel option. It will reach a total height of 675 ft, 49 floors. Towers two and three will have 504 residential condominiums.  They will reach a total of 530 ft; 40 floors in height. When completed, they will become the 11th and 21st tallest buildings in Los Angeles. The Park Hyatt project marks the luxury brand's first hotel and branded residences on the West Coast. That 49-story building will consist of a 184-room hotel topped by 164 serviced hotel residences. (The other 340 apartments will be housed in two 40-story towers, The Residences at Oceanwide Plaza.) 

The plaza is located adjacent to Crypto.com Arena and L.A. Live near the Los Angeles Convention Center, project participants say the complex's design offers a departure from the standardized glass curtain and masonry architecture of the city's downtown. The developer, Beijing-based Oceanwide Holdings, enlisted CallisonRTKL as a consultant to design features such as the 700-ft. LED ribbon wrapping the perimeter of the building. Beyond that, the firm plans to create glass elevators with LED bands and landscaped retail paseos that incorporate local plant life.

A retail mall named The Collection at Oceanwide Plaza, is scheduled to open on the first three floors above ground with 153,000 square feet of retail space. The mall will be open air and have deck views of L.A. Live.

The 9th floor will feature a two-acre private park. Features include private cantilevered deck pools, viewing platforms, basketball court, a dog park, green space and a running track.

Celebrity fitness trainer and nutritionist Harley Pasternak has conceptualized the development's amenity spaces, including a two-acre sky park. Leisure offerings such as a fitness center, children's play area, basketball court and two dog parks will also be on-site.

History
The site was a vacant parking lot used by Crypto.com Arena patrons in the South Park neighborhood of Downtown Los Angeles. The site is immediately west of the Metro Pico station.

This development is part of a group of projects currently under construction on Figueroa allowed to add giant video advert screens facing Staples Center. Along with Circa Towers and the Luxe Development. Oceanwide renderings also feature large ribbon style video LED screens.

The three luxury apartment towers were done with construction in April 2018. In January 2019, interior construction on the project was put on hold. The developer cited restructuring of capital and indicated work on the plaza would resume "shortly". Contractor Lendlease suspended work until late March 2019 when it was announced construction resumed after nine active liens have been filed by subcontractors totaling US$98.6 million. Due to the three month stop and restart of work, opening date was pushed back to an unknown date. Work once again stopped in late 2019 due to delays.  Media reports the towers are stuck in limbo over unpaid work and pending lawsuits. The towers are an example of Chinese pull back of capitol and investing in US real estate because of its ongoing trade dispute with the U.S. and a Beijing crackdown on credit and capital flight. Completion of work is reported to be uncertain and all work is now on-hold as of 2019.

In July 2018, FBI serves a search warrant on Google under money laundering and bribery statutes.  The warrant asks for information contained in the Gmail account of Raymond Chan, the former head of the Los Angeles Dept. of Building and Safety (appointed by Mayor Eric Garcetti) until he retired in 2016 and served for a year as a Los Angeles deputy mayor for economic development until June 2017. Also named: Councilman Jose Huizar, family members and other city hall aides; Councilman Curren Price; Deron Williams, chief of staff to Herb Wesson; and Joel Jacinto, a member of the city's board of public works (appointed by Garcetti). The warrant mentions seeking records for information on "development projects in and around Los Angeles that relate to foreign investors." Oceanwide Holdings and other Chinese development companies are also found in the pages of the search warrant.

In September 2022, it is announced that Oceanwide Plaza will restart work on this stalled Downtown Los Angeles mega-project in 2023 following these months of rumors of a shortfall in financing and halt on construction for three years. There was a status report on its Los Angeles project, which is set to include 504 condominiums, a 184-room Park Hyatt hotel, and approximately 150,000 square feet of retail space on a fully city block bounded by Figueroa, Flower, 11th, and 12th Streets. More than 85 percent has been completed on mechanical work on two of towers. After liquidity issues and global pandemic, it is indicated that there are active negotiations with investors. That will now aim to restart construction on the project in 2023, which take two years to finish up half-constructed buildings, on which the property could unlocked as early as 2025. Most of these developers would need to raise about $2.3 billion to complete construction of Oceanwide Plaza. That is one of China's largest real estate architects that is working to help save a Downtown Los Angeles project that is currently sinking.

See also
Architecture of the United States
Embezzlement
Tax evasion in the United States
Los Angeles Architecture and Design Museum
List of American architects
List of tallest buildings in Los Angeles

References

External links

China Oceanwide Holdings Group
Buildings and structures in Downtown Los Angeles